Naations are an Australian electronic music duo composed of singer, songwriter Nat Dunn and producer  Nicholas Routledge and established in 2016. They are best known for their collaborations with Duke Dumont and Hayden James

Career
In 2015, Natalie Dunn featured on two of Routledge's tracks (as Nicky Night Time). Naations was formed in 2016 and released their debut release "Kingdom" in August 2016. Their follow up single "Alive" was their introduction to UK radio, and gained support from BBC Radio 1. In June 2017, their collaboration with Duke Dumont and Gorgon City reached the top 40 in the United Kingdom.

The duo signed with First Access Records in 2018 and released "Touch Me" in March 2018, the first release on the label.

The duo's debut EP Teardrop was released in September 2018 and supported Anne-Marie on her 2018 Australian tour.

Discography

Extended plays

Singles

As lead artist

As featured artist

References

Australian indie pop groups
Australian electronic music groups
Musical groups established in 2016
Male–female musical duos
Pop music duos
Australian musical duos
2016 establishments in Australia